Labidochromis pallidus is a species of cichlid endemic to Lake Malawi where it is only known to occur around the Maleri Islands and around Thumbi West Island.  This species can reach a length of  SL.  It can also be found in the aquarium trade.

References

Fish of Malawi
pallidus
Fish described in 1982
Taxonomy articles created by Polbot
Fish of Lake Malawi